Kingston Hall is a historic home located at Kingston, Somerset County, Maryland. Located along the Big Annemessex River, it is a Georgian style dwelling of two stories plus an attic, three bays wide by two deep, connected by a one-story brick hyphen to a two-story-plus-loft brick kitchen wing.  Also on the property is the brick, circular ice house. The interior of the house features corner fireplaces. Interior woodwork mouldings are in a transitional style, bridging late Georgian and Federal styles.

History
The house was built by Thomas King on an  parcel of King family land named "Conclusion." Work began in 1855. At the time the property included the house, the two-story brick kitchen wing, a dairy, a blacksmith shop. a granary, two barns, a "negro house", a stable, a carriage house, a corn house, three log houses and a smoke house. After King's death, his daughter and son-in-law Henry James Carroll resided at Kingston Hall. Their son Thomas King Carroll (1793-1873) was born there and inherited the property. Thomas was briefly governor of Maryland 1830–31. Thomas's daughter Anna Ella Carroll (1815-1894), an advisor to Abraham Lincoln during the American Civil War, was born there.

Thomas King Carroll's accumulated debts forced the sale of the property in 1835. The new owner was John Upshur Dennis, whose family was also politically well-connected. Dennis's son George Robertson Dennis served in the United States Senate and three relatives were U.S. Representatives in Congress.

Kingston Hall was listed on the National Register of Historic Places in 1974.

See also
 Beverly (Princess Anne, Maryland), another King family home in Somerset County

References

External links
, including photo from 1985, at Maryland Historical Trust

Houses in Somerset County, Maryland
Houses on the National Register of Historic Places in Maryland
Houses completed in 1755
Georgian architecture in Maryland
Historic American Buildings Survey in Maryland
National Register of Historic Places in Somerset County, Maryland
Carroll family residences